Julius Eduard Hitzig (born Isaac Elias Itzig; 26 March 1780 in Berlin – 26 November 1849 in Berlin) was a German author and civil servant.

Born into the wealthy and influential Jewish Itzig family, he was between 1799 and 1806 a Prussian civil servant, became Criminal Counsel at the Berlin Supreme Court in 1815 and its director in 1825. In 1808 he established a publishing house and later a bookstore.

Hitzig was much involved in the Berlin literary life of his period, notably in connection with the salon of Rahel Varnhagen. He was friendly with E.T.A. Hoffmann, August von Kotzebue, Adelbert von Chamisso, Friedrich de la Motte Fouqué and Willibald Alexis. He was lampooned for his name change by Heinrich Heine.

His works include  "Der Neue Pitaval" (several volumes).

See also
Itzig family

External links
Works in German Gutenberg site
 

1780 births
1849 deaths
Writers from Berlin
18th-century German Jews
People from the Margraviate of Brandenburg
German male writers